Cynometra beddomei is a species of tree in the family Fabaceae. It was described from a single tree in the Kerala Western Ghats of India. In 1998 it was declared extinct as it had never been seen again since 1870.

Trees of the species have subsequently been identified in several parts of Kerala and southern Karnataka. The IUCN Status was updated to reflect this in 2020. It is threatened by habitat loss.

References

beddomei
Endemic flora of India (region)
Taxonomy articles created by Polbot
Endangered plants